Jacobite means follower of Jacob or James. Jacobite may refer to:

Religion
 Jacobites, followers of Saint Jacob Baradaeus (died 578). Churches in the Jacobite tradition and sometimes called Jacobite include:
 Syriac Orthodox Church, sometimes colloquially known as the Jacobite Church
 Jacobite Syrian Christian Church, autonomous branch of the Syriac Orthodox Church in Kerala, India
 Malankara Orthodox Syrian Church, an autocephalous Jacobite church based in Kerala, India
 Jacobite, follower of Henry Jacob (1563–1624), English clergyman
 Jacobites, Biblical name for descendants of Jacob

Politics
 Jacobites, followers of Jacobitism, political movement to resurrect the Stuart kingship, 1688–1780s
 Jacobite risings, series of rebellions in Great Britain and Ireland, 1688–1746
 Jacobite succession, the line through which the British crown in pretence has descended since 1688
 Jacobite consorts, those who were married to Jacobite pretenders since 1688
 Jacobite Peerage, peers and baronetcies granted by Jacobite claimants since 1688
 Neo-Jacobite Revival, political movement aimed at reviving Jacobite ambitions, 1886-1914
 Scottish Jacobite Party, political party, 2005–2011

Music
 "Ye Jacobites by Name", Scottish folk song originating in the Jacobite Risings
 Jacobite Relics, collection of songs related to the Jacobite risings, compiled by James Hogg in 1817
 Jacobites (band), English rock band formed in 1982

Other
 Jacobite Gold, 1745 shipment of Spanish gold to Scotland, rumoured to still be hidden at Loch Arkaig
 The Jacobite (steam train), a train in Scotland

See also 
 Jacob (disambiguation)
 Jacobin (disambiguation)
 Jacobian (disambiguation)
 Jacobean (disambiguation)
 Jacobus